Priesneria is a genus of thrips in the family Phlaeothripidae.

Species
 Priesneria akestra
 Priesneria doliicornis
 Priesneria insolitus
 Priesneria kellyana
 Priesneria longistylosa
 Priesneria peronis

References

Phlaeothripidae
Thrips
Thrips genera